Antipathes dichotoma is a species of colonial coral in the order Antipatharia, the black corals, so named because their calcareous skeletons are black. It was first described by the German zoologist and botanist Peter Simon Pallas in 1766, from a single specimen he received from near Marseilles in the Mediterranean Sea.

Description
It forms a sparsely branching structure with slender, flexible branches arranged irregularly around the trunk. The angle at which the branches project is variable but is often nearly 90°. The smaller branches bear four to six rows of short, smooth conical spines. They are arranged in a single series on the smallest branches and in multiple series on the largest ones. There is considerable variation in appearance of neighbouring colonies and in different parts of the same colony.

Distribution
Antipathes dichotoma occurs in the Mediterranean Sea and parts of the temperate western Atlantic Ocean. Its range includes waters off the coast of Marseilles, the Gulf of Naples, the Tyrrhenian Sea, the Bay of Biscay and off the coast of Morocco. Where this species has been recorded as occurring in the Indo-Pacific region, it may have been misidentified. The black coral growing off Hawaii, for example, has been reclassified as Antipathes griggi.

References

Antipathidae
Cnidarians of the Atlantic Ocean
Fauna of the Mediterranean Sea
Marine fauna of Africa
Marine fauna of Europe
Anthozoa of North Africa
Bay of Biscay
Tyrrhenian Sea
Corals described in 1766
Taxa named by Peter Simon Pallas